The title Hero of the Soviet Union was the highest distinction of the Soviet Union. It was awarded 12,775 times. Due to the large size of the list, it has been broken up into multiple pages.

 Dmitry Yablochkin ru
 Ivan Yaborov ru
 Yevgeny Yavenkov ru
 Vladimir Yavrumov ru
 Mikhail Yaglinsky ru
 Kerim Yagudin ru
 Ivan Yazovskikh ru
 David Yazydzhan ru
 Urumbek Yakibov ru
 Anton Yakimenko ru
 Ivan Rodionovich Yakimenko ru
 Ivan Semyonovich Yakimenko ru
 Aleksey Yakimov ru
 Pavel Yakimov ru
 Nikolai Yakimovich ru
 Aleksandr Yakimchuk ru
 Aleksandr Yakovenko ru
 Vasily Yakovenko ru
 Ilya Yakovenko ru
 Leonty Yakovenko ru
 Vasily Yakovets ru
 Aleksandr Yakovitsky ru
 Aleksandr Alekseyevich Yakovlev ru
 Aleksandr Ivanovich Yakovlev ru
 Aleksandr Nikiforovich Yakovlev ru
 Aleksey Aleksandrovich Yakovlev ru
 Aleksey Vladimirovich Yakovlev ru
 Aleksey Trofimovich Yakovlev ru
 Vasily Vasilyevich Yakovlev ru
 Vasily Nesterovich Yakovlev ru
 Vasily Nikolaevich Yakovlev ru
 Vasily Fyodorovich Yakovlev ru
 Yevgeny Yakovlev ru
 Yevstafy Yakovlev ru
 Mikhail Ivanovich Yakovlev ru
 Mikhail Pavlovich Yakovlev ru
 Nikolai Aleksandrovich Yakovlev ru
 Nikolai Yakovlevich Yakovlev ru
 Pyotr Yakovlev ru
 Sergey Yakovlev ru
 Timofey Akimovich Yakovlev ru
 Timofey Alekseyevich Yakovlev ru
 Ivan Yakovchenko ru
 Vasily Yaksargin ru
 Anton Yakuba ru
 Ivan Yakubin ru
 Gulyam Yakubov ru
 Ilya Yakobov ru
 Kasym Yakobov ru
 Masim Yakobov
 Osman Yakubov ru
 Ivan Yakubovsky (twice)
 Izrail Yakubovsky ru
 Pyotr Yakubovsky ru
 Aleksandr Yakunenko ru
 Aleksey Yakunin ru
 Pyotr Yakunin ru
 Nazym Yakupov ru
 Nikolai Yakupov ru
 Ivan Yakurnov ru
 Anatoly Yakushev ru
 Boris Yakushev ru
 Ivan Yakushenko ru
 Goergy Yakushkin ru
 Ivan Yakushkin ru
 Ivan Yalovoy ru
 Fyodor Yalovoy ru
 Pavel Yalugin ru
 Shagy Yamaletdinov ru
 Grigory Yamushev ru
 Aleksandr Yamshchikov ru
 Andrey Yanalov ru
 Nikolai Yanevich ru
 Vasily Yanitsky ru
 Mikhail Yanko ru
 Nikolai Yankov ru
 Stepan Yankovsky ru
 Ivan Yankovsky ru
 Bulat Yantimirov ru
 Ivan Yanushkovsky ru
 Pyotr Yantsev ru
 Vyacheslav Yanchenko ru
 Yevgeny Yaryomenko ru
 Vasily Yaremchuk ru
 Dmitry Yaremchuk ru
 Genrikh Yarzhin ru
 Ivan Yarkin ru
 Sergey Yarmak ru
 Ivan Yarovikov ru
 Artemy Yarovoy ru
 Grigory Yarovoy ru
 Pyotr Yarovoy ru
 Fyodor Yarovoy ru
 Filipp Yarovoy ru
 Aleksandr Yaroslavtsev ru
 Sergey Yaroslavtsev ru
 Ivan Yarotsky ru
 Otakar Yarosh ru
 Vladimir Yartsev ru
 Pavel Yartsev ru
 Ivan Yasnov ru
 Nikolai Yastrevinsky ru
 Aleksandr Yastrebov ru
 Vasily Yastrebov ru
 Viktor Yastrebtsev ru
 Gennady Yakhnov ru
 Mikhail Yakhogoev ru
 Viktor Yatsenevich ru
 Nikolai Yatsenko ru
 Pavel Yatsenko ru
 Pyotr Yatsenko ru
 Serafim Yatsenkosky ru
 Ivan Yatsunenko ru
 Grigory Yachmenyov ru
 Sergey Yachnik ru
 Viktor Yashin ru
 Georgy Yashin ru
 Ivan Yashin ru
 Nikolai Yashin ru
 Aleksey Yashnev ru
 Ivan Yashchenko ru
 Nikolai Yashchenko ru
 Rostislav Yashchuk ru
 Vadim Yevgrafov ru
 Sadofy Yevgrafov ru
 Aleksandr Yevdokimov ru
 Aleksey Yevdokimov ru
 Viktor Yevdokimov ru
 Vladimir Yevdokimov ru
 Grigory Yevdokimov ru
 Vasily Yevdoshenko ru
 Grigory Yevishev ru
 Vasily Yevlanov ru
 Ivan Yevlashev ru
 Ivan Yevplov ru
 Ivan Yevsevev ru
 Aleksandr Yevseyev ru
 Gavril Yevseyev ru
 Yevgeny Yevseyev ru
 Nikolai Yevseyev ru
 Vladimir Yevseyenko ru
 Georgy Yevstafev ru
 Nikolai Yevstafev ru
 Nikolai Yevstakhov ru
 Aleksandr Dmitrievich Yevstigneyev ru
 Aleksandr Semyonovich Yevstigneyev ru
 Aleksey Yevstigneyev ru
 Ivan Yevstigneyev ru
 Kirill Yevstigneyev (twice)
 Nikolai Yevstratov ru
 Nikolai Andreyevich Yevsyukov ru
 Nikolai Pavlovich Yevsyukov ru
 Ivan Yevteyev ru
 Mikhail Yevteyev ru
 Aleksandr Yevtushenko ru
 Nikifor Yevtushenko ru
 Tatevos Yegiazaryan ru
 Nikolai Yegipko
 Aleksandr Ivanovich Yegorov ru
 Aleksandr Petrovich Yegorov ru
 Aleksey Aleksandrovich Yegorov ru
 Aleksey Grigorievich Yegorov ru
 Aleksey Mikhailovich Yegorov ru
 Aleksey Semyonovich Yegorov ru
 Boris Yegorov
 Vasily Vasilyevich Yegorov ru
 Vasily Martynovich Yegorov ru
 Vasily Mikhailovich Yegorov ru
 Veniamin Yegorov ru
 Vladimir Yegorov ru
 Gavril Yegorov ru
 Georgy Yegorov
 Ivan Yegorov ru
 Ivan Klavdievich Yegorov ru
 Ilya Yegorov ru
 Konstantin Yegorov ru
 Mikhail Alekseyevich Yegorov
 Mikhail Anisimovich Yegorov ru
 Mikhail Artyomovich Yegorov ru
 Mikhail Ivanovich Yegorov ru
 Nikolai Sergeyevich Yegorov ru
 Pavel Vasilyevich Yegorov ru
 Pavel Ivanovich Yegorov ru
 Pyotr Yegorov ru
 Sergey Andreyevich Yegorov ru
 Sergey Vladimirovich Yegorov ru
 Spiridon Yegorov ru
 Timofey Yegorov ru
 Anna Yegorova
 Vladimir Yegorovovich ru
 Vasily Yegubchenko ru
 Pyotr Yevelev ru
 Aleksandr Yedemsky ru
 Viktor Yedkin ru
 Mikhail Yedomin ru
 Ivan Yedunov ru
 Pyotr Yedunov ru
 Valentin Yezhkov ru
 Ivan Yezhkov ru
 Fyodor Yezhkov ru
 Yevgeny Yezhov ru
 Konstantin Yezhov ru
 Nikolai Gerasimovich Yezhov ru
 Nikolai Konstantinovich Yezhov ru
 Dmitry Yezersky ru
 Vasily Yekimov ru
 Grigory Yekimov ru
 Aleksandr Yelagin ru
 Sergey Yelagin ru
 Andrey Yelgin ru
 Anatoly Alekseyevich Yeldyshev ru
 Anatoly Petrovich Yeldyshev ru
 Stepan Yeleynikov ru
 Mikhail Yelesin ru
 Zhanbek Yeleusov ru
 Gavriil Yeletskikh ru
 Aleksey Yelizarov ru
 Viktor Yelizarov ru
 Sergey Yelizarov ru
 Aleksandr Yeliseyev ru
 Aleksey Yeliseyev (twice)
 Andrey Yeliseyev ru
 Gennady Yeliseyev ru
 Grigory Yeliseyev ru
 Mikhail Yeliseyev ru
 Nikolai Yeliseyev ru
 Fedot Yeliseyev ru
 Pavel Yelisov ru
 Sergey Yelistratov ru
 Agey Yelkin ru
 Valentin Yelkin ru
 Leonid Yelkin ru
 Ivan Yeltsov ru
 Vasily Yelyutin ru
 Eduard Yelyan ru
 Aleksey Yemanov ru
 Vladimir Yemelin ru
 Anatoly Yemelyanenko ru
 Vasily Yemelyanenko ru
 Boris Yemelyanov ru
 Vasily Yemelyanov ru
 Viktor Yemelyanov ru
 Gavriil Yemelyanov ru
 Georgy Yemelyanov ru
 Dmitry Yemelyanov ru
 Ivan Yemelyanov ru
 Ignat Yemelyanov ru
 Pyotr Yemelyanov ru
 Dmitry Yemlyutin ru
 Pyotr Yemtsov ru
 Boris Yenaliev ru
 Andrey Yenzhievsky ru
 Mikhail Yenshin
 Aleksandr Yepanchin ru
 Nikolai Yepimakhov ru
 Aleksey Yepishev
 Mikhail Yepushkin ru
 Ivan Yerashov ru
 Boris Yeremeyev ru
 Andrey Yeryomenko
 Ivan Anisimovich Yeryomenko ru
 Ivan Trofimovich Yeryomenko ru
 Aleksandr Klimentevich Yeryomin ru
 Aleksandr Semyonovich Yeryomin ru
 Aleksey Yeryomin ru
 Boris Dmitrievich Yeryomin ru
 Boris Nikolaevich Yeryomin ru
 Ivan Andreyevich Yeryomin ru
 Ivan Yegorovich Yeryomin ru
 Mikhail Yeryomin ru
 Vasily Yeryomushkin ru
 Nikolai Yeryomushkin ru
 Daniil Yeretik ru
 Nikolai Yereshchenko ru
 Fyodor Yerzikov ru
 Pavel Yerin ru
 Yevgeny Yerlykin ru
 Vladimir Yermak ru
 Pavel Yermak ru
 Aleksandr Yermakov ru
 Andrey Yermakov ru
 Afanasy Yermakov ru
 Vasily Yermakov ru
 Dmitry Yermakov ru
 Ivan Yermakov ru
 Frol Yermakov ru
 Viktor Yermeneyev ru
 Pavel Yermilov ru
 Kozma Yermishin ru
 Aleksandr Yermolaev ru
 Vasily Yermolaev ru
 Vladimir Alekseyevich Yermolaev ru
 Vladimir Ivanovich Yermolaev ru
 Grigory Yermolaev ru
 Ivan Alekseyevich Yermolaev ru
 Ivan Dmitrievich Yermolaev ru
 Nikolai Yermolaev ru
 Sergey Yermolaev ru
 Feogent Yermolaev ru
 Panteley Yermolenko ru
 Pyotr Yeromasov ru
 Viktor Yeronko ru
 Aleksey Yerofeyev ru
 Grigory Yerofeyev ru
 Yevgeny Yerofeyev ru
 Afrikant Yerofeyevsky ru
 Leonid Yerofeyevskikh ru
 Aleksandr Yerokhin ru
 Aleksey Yerokhin ru
 Mikhail Yerokhin ru
 Viktor Yeroshenko ru
 Aleksandr Yeroshin ru
 Andrey Yershkin ru
 Valentin Yershkin ru
 Aleksandr Yershov ru
 Aleksey Yershov ru
 Vasily Yershov ru
 Viktor Yegorovich Yershov ru
 Viktor Zakharovich Yershov ru
 Vladimir Yershov ru
 Pavel Vladimirovich Yershov ru
 Pavel Ivanovich Yershov ru
 Vasily Yeryshev ru
 Boris Yeryashev ru
 Vladimir Yesaulenko ru
 Nikolai Yesaulenko ru
 Vladimir Yesebua ru
 Nursutbai Yesebulatov ru
 Pyotr Yesipov ru
 Saptar Yestimesov ru
 Ivan Yestin ru
 Ivan Yeskov ru
 Mikhail Yefanov ru
 Grigory Yefimenko ru
 Ivan Yefimenko ru
 Aleksandr Yefimov (twice)
 Andrey Yefimov ru
 Vadim Yefimov ru
 Vasily Mefodevich Yefimov ru
 Vasily Trofimovich Yefimov ru
 Vyacheslav Yefimov ru
 Ivan Yefimov ru
 Konstantin Yefimov ru
 Leonid Yefimov ru
 Matevy Yefimov ru
 Miron Yefimov ru
 Pyotr Yefimov ru
 Sergey Yefimov ru
 Nikolai Yefimtsev ru
 Ivan Yefremenko ru
 Andrey Georgievich Yefremov ru
 Andrey Yakovlevich Yefremov ru
 Vasily Vasilyevich Yefremov ru
 Vasily Sergeyevich Yefremov (twice)
 Dmitry Yefremov ru
 Ivan Yefremov ru
 Mikhail Yefremov ru
 Pyotr Yefremov ru
 Fyodor Yefremov ru
 Vasily Yolkin ru
 Ivan Yolkin ru
 Vasily Yubkin ru
 Ivan Yugalov ru
 Girsh Yudashkin ru
 Aleksandr Vasilyevich Yudin ru
 Aleksandr Dmitrievich Yudin ru
 Aleksey Yudin ru
 Viktor Mikhail Yudin ru
 Viktor Stepanovich Yudin ru
 Vladimir Yudin ru
 Ivan Yudin ru
 Mikhail Yudin ru
 Nikolai Lukyanovich Yudin ru
 Nikolai Nikolaevich Yudin ru
 Pavel Yudin ru
 Sergey Yudin ru
 Vasily Yuzhakov ru
 Ivan Yuzhaninov ru
 Aleksandr Yuzhilin ru
 Yakov Yula ru
 Abdullaazis Yuldashev ru
 Fayzulla Yuldashev ru
 Aleksandr Yulev ru
 Andrey Yumashev
 Ivan Yumashev
 Aleksandr Yunev
 Ivan Yunin ru
 Nikolai Yunkerov ru
 Boris Yunosov ru
 Oleg Yurasov ru
 Aleksey Yurin ru
 Boris Yurin ru
 Boris Yurkin ru
 Ivan Yurkin ru
 Nikolai Yurkin ru
 Aleksandr Yurkov ru
 Dmitry Yurkov ru
 Ivan Yurkov ru
 Nikolai Yurkovsky ru
 Anton Yurchenko ru
 Yegor Yurchenko ru
 Mikhail Yurchenko ru
 Nikolai Yurchenko ru
 Panteley Yurchenko ru
 Pyotr Aksentevich Yurchenko ru
 Pyotr Fomich Yurchenko ru
 Fyodor Yurchenko ru
 Aleksey Yurev ru
 Ivan Yurev ru
 Leonid Yurev ru
 Mikhail Yurev ru
 Ismail Yusupov ru
 Iosif Yufa ru
 Nikolai Yuferov ru
 Ivan Yufimov ru
 Aleksey Yukhanov ru
 Pyotr Yukhvitov ru
 Viktor Yukhnin ru
 Arsenty Yukhnovets ru
 Nikolai Yukhotnikov ru
 Sergey Yushin ru
 Mikhail Yushkov ru

References 

 
 Russian Ministry of Defence Database «Подвиг Народа в Великой Отечественной войне 1941—1945 гг.» [Feat of the People in the Great Patriotic War 1941-1945] (in Russian).

Lists of Heroes of the Soviet Union